Million Dollar Bill is the debut album by Australian musician Billy Thorpe, released in 1975. The album spawned the singles "It's Almost Summer", "Drive My Car", "Do the Best You Can" and "Mama Told Her". The album peaked at number 37 on the Kent Music Report in Australia.

Track listing

Personnel
Bass – Billy Kristian
Bongos – Peter Dawkins (tracks: 1)
Cello – David Pereira, Frederick McKay, Hans Gyors, Lal Kuring, Robert W. Miller, Vanessa Butters
Congas – J.C. Trevisano (tracks: 1, 5, 8)
Drums, percussion – Gill Mathews
Electric piano [Fender Rhodes] – Jack Hotop
Guitar – John Fetter (tracks: 1, 2, 5, 8)
Guitar, vocals – Billy Thorpe
Keyboards – Warren Morgan
Saxophone – Don Wright, Tony Buchanan
Synthesizer – William Motzing
Trombone – Arthur Hubbard, Bob McIvor, George Brodbeck, Ken Herron
Trumpet – Boot Thompsen, Ed D'Amico, Keith Dubber, Mike Bukousky, Mike Cleary
Violin – Alice Waten, Della Woods, Frank Coe, Gordon Bennett, John Lyle, Julie Batty, Klara Korda, Phillip Hart, Robert Ingram
Vocals – Allison McAllum, Janice Slater, Kerrie Biddell

Production
Arranged by [Brass, Strings, Vocal] – William Motzing
Engineer – Gerry Stevens
Mastered by Jo Hansch
Produced by Peter Dawkins

References

External links
Billy Thorpe – Million Dollar Bill @Discogs
Billy Thorpe - Million Dollar Bill at Last FM
Thorpe - Million Dollar Bill at Rate Your Music

1975 debut albums
Billy Thorpe albums
Festival Records albums
Infinity Records albums
Albums produced by Peter Dawkins (musician)